New Berlin Historic District is a national historic district located at New Berlin in Chenango County, New York. The district includes 118 contributing buildings. It encompasses the village's historic core and includes commercial, residential, civic, ecclesiastical, and railroad related buildings. Among the notable buildings are the Central Hotel (ca. 1855), National Bank and Trust Building (ca. 1900), First Baptist Church (1840), St. Andrew's Episcopal Church (1848, designed by Richard Upjohn), Municipal Building, and New Berlin Central High School.  Also located within the district is the separately listed Horace O. Moss House.

It was added to the National Register of Historic Places in 1982.

References

Historic districts on the National Register of Historic Places in New York (state)
Historic districts in Chenango County, New York
National Register of Historic Places in Chenango County, New York